This is a list of the main career statistics of former professional tennis player Hana Mandlíková.

Major finals

Grand Slam finals

Singles: 8 (4 titles, 4 runners-up)

Doubles: 4 (1 title, 3 runners-up)

Year-End Championships finals

Singles: 1 (1 runner–up)

Doubles: 1 (1 title)

WTA career finals

Singles: 52 (27–25)

Doubles: 38 (19–19)

Grand Slam performance timelines

Singles

Doubles

Record against other top players
Mandlíková's win-loss record against certain players who have been ranked World No. 10 or higher is as follows:

Players who have been ranked World No. 1 are in boldface.

 Bettina Bunge 16–1
/ Helena Suková 12–2
 Sylvia Hanika 10–5
 Zina Garrison 9–4
 Wendy Turnbull 9–6
 Sue Barker 8–0
 Pam Shriver 8–2
 Virginia Ruzici 8–4
 Andrea Jaeger 8–6
 Barbara Potter 7–1
 Mima Jaušovec 7–4
 Kathy Jordan 7–5
 Chris Evert 7–21
/ Martina Navratilova 7–29
 Kathleen Horvath 6–0
 Lori McNeil 6–0
 Claudia Kohde-Kilsch 6–3
 Jo Durie 5–2
 Gabriela Sabatini 5–2
 Carling Bassett-Seguso 5–3
 Lisa Bonder 4–0
 Betty Stöve 4–0
 Andrea Temesvári 4–0
 Bonnie Gadusek 4–1
 Catarina Lindqvist 4–1
 Dianne Fromholtz 4–2
/ Manuela Maleeva 4–3
 Mary Joe Fernández 3–0
 Virginia Wade 3–0
 Nathalie Tauziat 2–0
 Kathy Rinaldi 2–1
 Billie Jean King 2–2
 Tracy Austin 2–7
 Rosemary Casals 1–0
 Françoise Dürr 1–0
 Julie Halard-Decugis 1–0
 Magdalena Maleeva 1–0
/ Natasha Zvereva 1–0
 Steffi Graf 1–8
 Amanda Coetzer 0–1
 Evonne Goolagong Cawley 0–1
// Monica Seles 0–2

External links
 
 
 

Mandlíková, Hana